Das Bunte Leben (The Colourful Life) is a 1907 tempera painting by Russian artist Wassily Kandinsky.

History
Dutch art collector, Emanuel Lewenstein bought immediately after it was finished in 1907. After his death, his widow Hedwig loaned it to Amsterdam's Stedelijk Museum for safekeeping.

On 3 March 2017, three of his heirs filed suit in New York City against Bayerische Landesbank who believe they now own it, in respect of the painting, now valued at $80 million. 

The lawsuit claims that the painting was effectively taken and sold without permission, "The painting was taken from its legitimate owners in 1940 in violation of international law during the period of the Nazi occupation in the Netherlands in furtherance of the Nazi campaign of Jewish genocide".

Das Bunte Leben is on show at the Städtische Galerie im Lenbachhaus, in Munich, Germany.

See also
List of paintings by Wassily Kandinsky

References

External links 

1907 paintings
Paintings by Wassily Kandinsky
Paintings in the collection of the Lenbachhaus